Jim Hallahan may refer to:

 Jim Hallahan Sr. (1878–?), Australian rules footballer
 Jim Hallahan Jr. (born 1911), Australian rules footballer, son of the above
 Jim Hallahan (motorsport), member of Canadian Motorsport Hall of Fame
 Jim Hallahan (basketball), College basketball coach, 1981–82 NCAA Division I men's basketball season

See also
 Hallahan (surname)